"You Love Us" is a song by Welsh alternative rock band Manic Street Preachers. It was initially released as a single on 7 May 1991 by record label Heavenly. The song was re-recorded and released on 20 January 1992 by record label Columbia as the third single from their debut studio album Generation Terrorists.

Release 

"You Love Us" was originally released as a single on 7 May 1991 by record label Heavenly. This version of the song begins with a sample of Krzysztof Penderecki's "Threnody to the Victims of Hiroshima" and ends with a coda which includes a drum sample from Iggy Pop's "Lust for Life".

B-side "Spectators of Suicide" includes a vocal sample of a speech by Black Panther Bobby Seale, a shorter clip of which had previously appeared on the last track of McCarthy's 1989 album The Enraged Will Inherit the Earth. The track was re-recorded for MSP's debut studio album Generation Terrorists

You Love Us was also re-recorded and released again on 20 January 1992 as the third single from Generation Terrorists. The new version also featured no hook, but had a much heavier rock sound and the "Lust for Life" coda was replaced, on the album version of the track, by an extended guitar solo. This version of the song reached number 16 in the UK charts on 1 February 1992. It was the most successful single released from the album. It also made an appearance as track number six on the 2002 greatest hits compilation, Forever Delayed.

The CD single included the B-sides "A Vision of Dead Desire", "We Her Majesty's Prisoners" and a live cover of Guns N' Roses' "It's So Easy". The 12" featured "A Vision of Dead Desire" and "It's So Easy" and the 7" and cassette just "A Vision of Dead Desire".

Content and style 
David Owens proclaimed the track a "firebrand punk classic". By Clash Music, You Love Us has been illustrated as an example of "glam metal glory".

Live performances 

The song was performed live with missing guitarist and lyricist Richey James Edwards just five weeks before he vanished, which was the last time Edwards was seen on stage. The band as a foursome played the song as set-closer for their sell-out final gig at the London Astoria.

Legacy 
"You Love Us" is widely regarded as one of the band's best songs. In 2011, NME ranked the song number six on their list of the 10 greatest Manic Street Preachers songs, and in 2022, The Guardian ranked the song number five on their list of the 30 greatest Manic Street Preachers songs.

In December 2015, Cardiff brewers Crafty Devil named a beer after the song.

Track listing

Heavenly Version 
 CD and 12" version

 7" version

Album version 
 CD version

 12" version

 7" version

Charts

References

Sources

External links 

 

1992 singles
Manic Street Preachers songs
1992 songs
Columbia Records singles
Songs written by Richey Edwards
Songs written by James Dean Bradfield
Songs written by Nicky Wire
Songs written by Sean Moore (musician)